Griesbach can refer to:

People
Johann Jakob Griesbach (1745–1812), German biblical textual critic
John Griesbach (1798–1875), British composer
August Grisebach (1814–1879), German botanist
William Antrobus Griesbach (1878–1945), Canadian politician and soldier
Franz Griesbach (1892–1984), German World War II general
Carl Ludolf Griesbach (1847–1903), British geologist of Austrian origin
William C. Griesbach (born 1954), American judge

Places
Griesbach-au-Val, Alsace, France
Bad Griesbach (Rottal), town in Bavaria, Germany
Bad Peterstal-Griesbach, town in Baden-Württemberg, Germany
CFB Griesbach, former Canadian military base, named after William Antrobus Griesbach
Griesbach, Edmonton, neighbourhood built on the site of the base
Griesbach Creek, Axel Heiberg Island, named after Carl Ludolf Griesbach

Other
Griesbach hypothesis, named after Johann Jakob Griesbach

German toponymic surnames